Aryna Sabalenka defeated Elena Rybakina in the final, 4–6, 6–3, 6–4 to win the women's singles tennis title at the 2023 Australian Open. It was her first major singles title.
Sabalenka dropped just one set during the tournament, to Rybakina in the championship match. Rybakina became the first Kazakhstani player to progress past the fourth round, and the first player since Jennifer Capriati in 2001 to defeat three consecutive major champions in a single edition of the Australian Open. By reaching the final, Rybakina made her debut in the top ten of the WTA Rankings.

Ashleigh Barty was the reigning champion, but she retired from professional tennis in March 2022.

Barty's retirement and Angelique Kerber and Naomi Osaka’s absences (both due to pregnancy) meant that Victoria Azarenka and Sofia Kenin were the only former champions left in the draw. They met in the first round, with Azarenka winning in straight sets.

Jeļena Ostapenko became the first Latvian to reach the Australian Open quarterfinals.

Seeds

Draw

Finals

Top half

Section 1

Section 2

Section 3

Section 4

Bottom half

Section 5

Section 6

Section 7

Section 8

Championship match statistics

Seeded players 
The following are the seeded players. Seedings are based on WTA rankings as of 9 January 2023. Rankings and points before are as of 16 January 2023.

Withdrawn players 
The following player would have been seeded, but withdrew before the tournament began.

Other entry information

Wild cards 

Sources:

Protected ranking

Qualifiers

Lucky losers

Withdrawals 
The entry list was released by Tennis Australia based on the WTA rankings for the week of 5 December 2022.

 – not included on entry list& – withdrew from entry list

See also 
2023 Australian Open – Day-by-day summaries
2023 WTA Tour
2023 ITF Women's World Tennis Tour
International Tennis Federation

Notes

References

External links 
 2023 Australian Open Women's Singles draw
 2023 Australian Open – Women's draws and results at the International Tennis Federation

Women's Singles
Australian Open
Australian Open (tennis) by year – Women's singles